The World Ecological Forum is an independent and non-profit organization that is headquartered in Visby, Gotland, the biggest island in Sweden. The Forum's flagship event is an annual meeting that brings together selected business leaders, policy makers, academia and experts to discuss environmental issues of global concern.

The organization also develops and implements collaborative projects for global sustainability. A recent example is the Green Marketplace initiative that was developed to facilitate green technology transfer in partnership with Tynax, the world's largest technology trading exchange.

Vision

The World Ecological Forum is committed to creating environmental and economic balance in order to achieve sustainable growth, welfare and social justice for all.

World Ecological Forum 2010

The World Ecological Forum 2010 was held at Wisby Strand Congress & Event on 1–2 July 2010. The Summit focused on fighting climate change and boosting green technology.

Awards

The World Ecological Forum Innovation Race is a competition that aims to find and promote green innovations. The competition is open to entrepreneurs, employees and students who may participate as individuals or in groups.

The World Ecological Forum Global Impact Award is administered by the World Ecological Forum and awarded for outstanding achievements in sustainable development. Awarded once yearly (in July), the nominations are announced in the spring.

Founders

The World Ecological Forum was founded by Alec and Sari Arho Havrén in January 2008. Alec Arho Havrén, born in 1965, is a social entrepreneur that is known for building and running Gotland Ring, the world's first ecological race and test track. He is also an expert on eco-driving. Sari Arho Havrén, born in 1966, has a Ph.D. from Helsinki University and international experience of working with green technologies and environmental projects.

Executive Steering Committee

The Executive Steering Committee consists of Alec Arho Havrén, Sari Arho Havrén, Anna Hrdlicka, Bishop Lennart Koskinen, Alfred Kwok, Tomas Otterström, Marianne Samuelsson, Jenny Harler, Professor Derek Shearer, Professor Kai Wartiainen, Professor Dr Po Chi Wu, Pasi Rutanen, Carola Wictorsson, Doris Kwan, and Charles Gloor.

References
 World Ecological Forum Homepage
 http://www.sr.se/gotland/nyheter/artikel.asp?artikel=3373825 (Swedish radio)
 http://www.nyteknik.se/nyheter/energi_miljo/miljo/article706199.ece (Article in Swedish)
 http://www.gotland.net/sv/moten/klimatmote-pa-gotland-i-sommar (Article in Swedish)
 http://www.miljo-utveckling.se/nyheter/artikel.php?id=30496 (Article in Swedish)
 http://www.idg.se/2.1085/1.284343/efter-cop-15-floppen--nya-tag-pa-gotland (Article in Swedish)
 http://miljoaktuellt.idg.se/2.1845/1.284373/nya-klimatforhandlingar-i-visby (Article in Swedish)
 http://www.meetingsinternational.se/news.php?id=311 (Article in Swedish)

External links
 World Ecological Forum Homepage

Environmental economics
Environmental organizations based in Sweden